Heliomata is a genus of moths in the family Geometridae.

Species
Heliomata cycladata Grote & Robinson, 1866 – common spring moth
Heliomata fulliola Barnes & McDunnough, 1917
Heliomata glarearia (Denis & Schiffermuller, 1775)
Heliomata infulata (Grote, 1863) – rare spring moth

References

External links

Macariini
Moth genera